Gelliehausen is a  nucleated village just south of Benniehausen in the Gemeinde Gleichen in southern Lower Saxony with a population of 452 (as of 12 December 2005).   The village is located at the foot of the twin hills called the Gleichen. The small community has a pond next to its  "Bürgerhaus."

The mayor is Gerhard Nolte.

The most famous person associated with Gelliehausen is Gottfried August Bürger, an eighteenth-century poet who lived there for a while.

External links
http://www.gleichen.de/gelliehausen/home.htm (in German)

Villages in Lower Saxony